Søren Eriksen (19 May 1893 – 23 September 1968) was a Danish wrestler. He competed in the freestyle lightweight and the Greco-Roman featherweight events at the 1924 Summer Olympics.

References

External links
 

1893 births
1968 deaths
Olympic wrestlers of Denmark
Wrestlers at the 1924 Summer Olympics
Danish male sport wrestlers
Sportspeople from Aarhus
20th-century Danish people